Minister of Health is the person in charge of the Ministry of Health of Montenegro (Ministarstvo zdravlja). Dragoslav Šćekić is the current Minister of Health, since 4 December 2020.

Ministers of Health, since 2006

References

Government ministries of Montenegro
Ministries established in 2006
2006 establishments in Montenegro
Montenegro